"H. P. Lovecraft's Dreams in the Witch-House" is the second episode of the first season of Masters of Horror, directed by Stuart Gordon. It is adapted from the short story "The Dreams in the Witch House" by American horror author H. P. Lovecraft. It originally aired in North America on November 4, 2005. Ezra Godden had previously starred in another Stuart Gordon-directed Lovecraft adaptation, Dagon, based on Lovecraft's novella The Shadow over Innsmouth.

Plot
University student Walter Gilman moves to a very cheap room in an old boarding house. He hears shrill screaming and rushes to help his neighbor, Frances, to find that she was being chased by a large rat. He seeks assistance from the manager, but he refuses to help. One of the tenants, Masurewicz, asks Walter if the large rat had a human face. He becomes close with Frances the following week, and even lends her money to keep her in the boarding house.

While studying for his thesis, Walter finds Masurewicz praying and hitting his head on a chair. The old man advises Walter about that rodent with a man's face and a witch that would be after him. He warns Walter that the house is evil, relating that he, like Walter, moved in at a young age in the same room that Walter is currently renting. He states he is still in the house only to pray to stop her. Masurewicz offers a crucifix for his protection, but Walter rebuffs the gesture.

Frances gets a job interview and asks Walter to watch her son Danny. After she leaves, Danny begins to cry if he isn't in Walter's hands. Walter notices that Danny is wearing a large crucifix. When Walter falls asleep, a cloaked witch appears as a nude Frances and seduces him. He starts having sex with her, she begins to claw the skin off of his back mid-foreplay. Initially ignoring the pain, he becomes horrified when she suddenly transforms into an old witch and laughs devilishly as he screams in horror, making him wake up outside of Frances's room. He rushes back when he hears Danny fiercely crying. Frances returns and crossly questions him over why he left him, and upon explaining his dreams, Frances suggests for him to seek psychiatric help which he postpones for the confirmation or denial of his experiences by laying flour for tracking any potential footprints or pugmarks.

He goes back to his room, and it is revealed that the witch has indeed carved a pentagram into his back. An audible disturbance again wakes him up, he spots little pugmarks and a scratch in the flour leading under his bed. He peers down and suddenly a mysterious hand reaches out and after few seconds, grabs him, he struggles to free himself of its grasp but is eventually dragged inside. He finds himself in a dark corridor, with the rat on his shoulder. The rodent repeatedly implores him to "sign" and strongly chews his wrist, leading to his blood from veins pouring onto the book beneath as the witch informs that now he has to sacrifice an infant for her, namely Danny. Walter then finds himself up seated in front of an open book in the restricted access room of a library in Miskatonic University in which he sees diagrams about unearthly geometry and on following pages, infant sacrificing rituals involving other creatures as well as that witch and rodent. He isn't able to discern the title in non-Latin script from the book's cover as it is badly damaged, however it is revealed as "Necronomicon" by a furious warden who intercepts him there and, unconvinced by his quick replies that he doesn't know how he entered the room, goes outside to call for security, giving him a chance to flee. Having returned, Walter's attempt to warn Frances goes in vain as she repeats to him that now he must seek psychological help and asks him to stay away from Danny.

Masurewicz comes to check on Walter, telling him that his soul is in peril. Masurewicz reveals that he had killed children because of the witch. Masurewicz hands the crucifix over to Walter and leaves. Walter breaks through the wall in his room where the witch and rodent come through and is mildly interrupted by the manager outside who, upon seeing him steadily approaching with raised hammer in his hands, shuts the door to oneself and flees, he soon makes a big enough hole in the attic and brings his lamplight for aid in exploring. Failing to see much, he climbs up and finds the skeletons of past sacrifices. The rodent's voice can be heard reverberating across, stating "she's coming for you." Walter then finds the sacrifice chamber, with crying Danny caged up. The cloaked witch places a silver dagger into Walter's hand and commands Walter to kill Danny. Walter tries to resist but fails in avoiding to mark him by making an abrasion in his neck, thereby causing a bit of his blood to spill. The witch continues telekinetically forcing him to go for the kill, backed by the rodent's hypnotic cheering but Walter succeeds in redirecting the knife to her. This leads to a struggle where she steals the knife and it gets dropped to the floor—and Walter gouges her eyes out with his own hands, causing her own blood to pour out and eventually managing to strangle her with the crucifix.

He takes Danny and escapes, crash landing in Frances's room and takes a moment of relief. Danny starts fiercely crying again, and Walter notices that the growling rodent is chewing through Danny's neck and sucking his blood dry. Frances is locked out and desperately shrieks for Walter to open the door immediately, and gets even more anxious by seeing neon lights emitting from inside the room. Simultaneously, Masurewicz is in his room, praying and bleeding from having struck his head to the table numerous times. The manager and two police officers arrive and the former finally opens the door through his service keys to find Walter smudged by blood—with Danny's lifeless body in his lap. Walter is taken to a psych ward and in a session with his attending psychologist, continues to swear by his version of events but convinced that he is simply in denial of the crime he committed single-handedly, the psychologist diagnoses him with paranoid schizophrenia.

The CSI arrives and informs of the final forensic investigations into the recovered infant skeletons, some of which dated back 300 years, the knife, and Danny's autopsy. In addition to dispelling the prison officer's conviction that Walter murdered each of them, he eventually informs the officer and psychologist outside the ward of a newly discovered and unclassified DNA from Danny's animal bites (which the cop instinctively attributed to Walter before). They leave. Masurewicz hangs himself. Sometimes afterwards, neon lights appear in Walter's ward followed by the familiar growling of that rodent. Walter is then heard shrieking in agony, prompting an urgent visit by a nurse. Upon unlocking and entering his ward, he witnesses profuse external bleeding from tormented Walter and immediately calls for backup. The psychologist arrives and she asks of the matter by witnessing the pooling blood, the nurse lifts his top uniform to reveal that rodent jumping out of his colon—with wide wounds serving as the opening. It is seen immediately running out of the ward laughing and in the room at the nearest exit of the corridor, makes space for entering an incidentally opening door of the room by interjecting "boo!" to the warden and runs inside to its escape. Walter stops agonising and moving, laid back still to the wall, prompting psychologist to check for his pulse. She immediately determines that he died from blood loss. The film ends the same way it began, with a sign in front of the eponymous "witch house" reading "Room for Rent."

Cast
 Ezra Godden as Walter Gilman
 Jay Brazeau as Mr. Dombrowski
 Campbell Lane as Masurewicz
 Chelah Horsdal as Frances Elwood

DVD and Blu-ray
The DVD was released by Anchor Bay Entertainment on March 28, 2006. The episode was the second episode as well as the second to be released on DVD. The episode appears on the first volume of the Blu-ray compilation of the series.

Similarities to the source material
The television adaptation significantly truncates the plot of Lovecraft's 1933 short story. It also sets the story in contemporary times, updating small details while remaining relatively faithful to the original plot. For example, whereas in the Lovecraft story the protagonist is a student of quantum mechanics, in the television adaption he studies string theory. The TV adaptation features the rat-like creature with a human face, Brown Jenkin, from Lovecraft's original tale, and also the witch Keziah Mason. In a nod to Lovecraft's original inspiration for Miskatonic University, the protagonist of the television adaptation wears a Miskatonic University T-shirt featuring a design based on the seal of Brown University.

External links
 
 
 Review for Dreams in the Witch-House television episode at Dread Central

Cthulhu Mythos films
American haunted house films
Masters of Horror episodes
2005 American television episodes
Films directed by Stuart Gordon
Films scored by Richard Band
Television episodes about witchcraft